In 2004, there were 24 This American Life episodes.

Episode 256 - "Living Without"
Act 1: Do You Hear What I Hear? – Nubar Alexanian
Act 2: The Journalism of Deprivation – Sarah Vowell
Act 3: The Call of the Great Indoors – Chelsea Merz
Act 4: Tin Man – Judith Budnitz
Episode 257 - "What I Should've Said"
Act 1: Freeze Frame – Jonathan Goldstein
Act 2: In the Bush Leagues – Charles Monroe-Kane
Act 3: A Can of Worms – David Sedaris
Act 4:  Life Sentence – Mike Miller
Episode 258 - "Leaving the Fold"
Act 1: I've Got a Secret I've Been Hiding From You	 – Alex Blumberg
Act 2: God and Hockey – Ira Glass
Act 3: Nuns Amok – Susan Drury
Episode 259 - "Promised Land"
Act 1: Across the Street from Heaven – Starlee Kine
Act 2: Life in the Fast Lane – David Rakoff
Act 3: Mystery Train – Hillary Frank
Episode 260 - "The Facts Don't Matter"
Act 1: Straight Eyes on the Quirin Guys – Chris Neary
Act 2: Mush Polling – Sarah Koenig
Episode 261 - "The Sanctity of Marriage"
Act 1: What Really Happens in Marriage – Ira Glass
Act 2: The Defense of Marriage Act – Adam Felber
Act 3: I Want to be a Statistic – Starlee Kine
Episode 262 - "Miracle Cures"
Act 1: Changing the Channeler – Davy Rothbart
Act 2: The Entities Known as The Food and Drug Administration – Ira Glass
Episode 263 - "Desperate Measures"
Act 1: Hasta La Vista, Arnie – Scott Miller
Act 2: We Built This City on Rock and Coal – Ira Glass
Act 3: The Router Less Taken
Act 4: The Rocks at Rock Bottom – Hillary Frank
Episode 264 - "Special Treatment"
Show description: On the ethics and reality of preferential treatment
Act 1: Lunchtime with the King of Ketchup – Jonathan Goldstein
Act 2: Except for that One Problem, it's Perfect – Gregory Warner
Act 3: Mommie's Psychic Helper – Aimee Phan
Act 4: The Way to a Boy's Heart Is Through His Stomach – Lisa Carver
Episode 265 - "Fake Science"
Show description: On cranks, distortions of science, and the application of pseudo-scientific methods to questions outside the realm of science
Act 1: Spook Science – Jake Warga
Act 2: Government Science – Alex Blumberg
Act 3: Beauty Science – Adam Sternbergh
Act 4: Radio Science – Brent Runyon
Episode 266 - "I'm From the Private Sector and I'm Here to Help"
Show description: On the work of private defense contractors in post-invasion Iraq
Act 1: Airport – Nancy Updike
Act 2: Hank – Nancy Updike
Act 3: Green Zone – Nancy Updike
Act 4: Electricity – Nancy Updike
Act 5: Karen – Nancy Updike
Act 6: Cops – Nancy Updike
Act 7: Hank Redux – Nancy Updike
Episode 267 - "Propriety"
Show description: On civility, profanity, and the Federal Communications Commission
Act 1: Government Says the Darnedest Things – Ira Glass
Act 2: Dems Gone Wild! – Ken Kurson
Act 3: Swiss Near-Miss – Samantha Hunt
Episode 268 - "My Experimental Phase"
Act 1: That's Funny, You Don't Look Jewish – David Segal
Act 2: Miami Vices – Sascha Rothchild, Mortified
Episode 269 - "Someone to Watch Over Me"
Act 1: Doctoring the Doctor – Jo Giese
Act 2: The Over-Protective Kind
Act 3: Are You a Man or a Mouse? – Aimee Bender
Episode 270 - "Family Legend"
Act 1: Take My Cheese, Please – Ira Glass
Act 2: We Don't Talk About That – Kevin O'Leary
Act 3: Admissions – Katia Dunn
Episode 271 - "Best Interests"
Act 1: I'd Rather Not – Ira Glass
Act 2: Exodus of One – Alex Kotlowitz
Episode 272 - "Big Tent"
Show description: On the Republican Party during the campaign season preceding the U.S. presidential election, 2004
Act 1: Pink Elephant – Patrick Howell
Act 2: Right and Righter – Alex Blumberg
Act 3: Indecent Proposal – Shane DuBow
Act 4: It's My Party
Episode 273 - "Put Your Heart In It"
Show description: On motivation and passion, especially regarding career choices
Act 1: Farm Eye for the Farm Guy – George DeVault
Act 2: Diary of a Long-shot – Teal Krech
Act 3: Contrails of My Tears – Brett Martin
Episode 274 - "Enemy Camp '04"
Show description: On the Iraq war and the War on Terrorism (a discussion with James Fallows and Richard Perle), the Roman Catholic Church sex abuse scandal, and parasites
Act 1: Our Own Worst Enemy? – Ira Glass
Act 2: Confession – Carl Marziali
Act 3: Blood Agent – Ira Glass
Act 4: And I Love Her – Etgar Keret
Episode 275 - "Two Steps Back"
Show description: On the decline of Washington Irving Elementary School in Chicago, once a model for success in public education reforms
Act 1: 1994 – Ira Glass
Act 2: 2004 – Ira Glass
Episode 276 - "Swing Set"
Show description: On swing voters, who were thought to play an important role in the U.S. presidential election, 2004, which took place a few days after the episode first aired
Act 1: My Buddy, Hackett – Ira Glass
Act 2: Cold-Cock the Vote – Jack Hitt
Act 3: One Son, One Vote – Sarah Koenig
Act 4: He's Got Legs – Lisa Pollak
Episode 277 - "Apology"
Show description: On apologizing
Act 1: Repeat After Me – David Sedaris
Act 2: Dial "S" for Sorry – Ira Glass
Act 3: Two Words You Never Want to Hear From Your Doctor – Starlee Kine
Episode 278 - "Spies Like Us"
Show description: On surveillance and eavesdropping by private citizens
Act 1: The Lobbyist – Burt Covit
Act 2: Life With the Haters – Beth Lisick
Act 3: Mystery Shoppers – Lisa Pollak
Act 4: Stop Bugging Me – Jane Feltes
Episode 279 - "Auto Show"
Show description: On dB drag racing, vehicle theft, car salespeople, and elderly drivers
Act 1: Crunk in the Trunk – David Segal
Act 2: Baby You Can't Drive My Car – Jamie Kitman
Act 3: Objects in the Rear View Mirror May Be Alarmingly Familiar – Curtis Sittenfeld
Act 4: Not Your Father's Chevrolet Salesman – Sarah Koenig
Act 5: End of the Road – Lisa Pollack

External links
This American Lifes radio archive for 2004

2004
This American Life
This American Life